The Treaty of Versailles is the 1919 peace treaty that followed the Paris Peace Conference and officially ended World War I.

The Treaty of Versailles may also refer to:
Treaty of Versailles (1756), a defense alliance between France and Austria
Treaty of Versailles (1757), an expansion of the 1756 Versailles treaty to Saxony, Sweden, and Russia
Treaty of Versailles (1758), a confirmation of the 1756 and the 1757 Versailles treaties
Treaty of Versailles (1768), a treaty in which the Republic of Genoa ceded Corsica to France
Treaties of Versailles (1783), a treaty that ended French and Spanish hostilities against Great Britain in the American Revolutionary War
Treaty of Versailles (1787), a treaty between France and the Vietnamese lord Nguyễn Ánh
Treaty of Versailles (1871), a treaty that ended the FrancoPrussian War

See also
Small Treaty of Versailles, an additional treaty signed on the same date as the 1919 Treaty of Versailles between some of the newly established nations and the League of Nations
 Treaty of Paris (disambiguation)